Javier Luciano Margas Loyola (born 10 May 1969) is a Chilean former professional footballer who played as a defender.

Club career

Colo-Colo
Margas was born in Santiago de Chile. He experienced the most successful period in his career with his first club Colo-Colo, where he was part of four league championship winning squads. He was also part of the club's first Copa Libertadores win in 1991, and also won two other international tournaments.

Club América
In 1996 Margas joined Club América in Mexico but didn't settle, returning to Chile in 1997.

Universidad Católica
Margas then joined Universidad Católica, where he was part of the squad that won the 1997 Apertura.

West Ham United
Margas' last years as a player were spent with West Ham United. He scored once during his spell with West Ham, in a 5–0 win over Coventry City in April 2000. In 2001, Margas gained notoriety for disappearing from England without a trace and many weeks passed before he was found in his home country, having effectively retired from football.

International career
Margas played 63 times for the Chile national team. He played in Chile's four games at the 1998 FIFA World Cup.

Personal life
Margas was famous for dyeing his hair in different colours and shapes (most notably with the Chilean flag colours).

Since retiring from football, Margas has worked as a youth coach at Colo-Colo, appeared on a reality TV show called Expedición Robinson, ran his own business, and bought former dictator Augusto Pinochet's armoured car.

His daughter, Catalina, was a Chile international footballer at under-17 level and took part in the 2008 South American U-17 Women's Championship.

Career statistics
Scores and results list Chile's goal tally first, score column indicates score after each Margas goal.

Honours
Colo-Colo
 Primera División de Chile: 1989, 1990, 1991, 1993, 1996
 Copa Libertadores: 1991
 Recopa Sudamericana: 1991
 Copa Interamericana: 1992
 Copa Chile: 1988, 1989, 1990, 1994

Universidad Católica
 Primera División de Chile: 1997–A

References

External links

1969 births
Living people
Chilean people of French descent
Footballers from Santiago
Chilean footballers
Chile international footballers
Chile under-20 international footballers
Colo-Colo footballers
Club América footballers
Club Deportivo Universidad Católica footballers
West Ham United F.C. players
Chilean Primera División players
Liga MX players
Premier League players
Association football defenders
1998 FIFA World Cup players
1991 Copa América players
1993 Copa América players
1995 Copa América players
1997 Copa América players
1999 Copa América players
Chilean expatriate footballers
Chilean expatriate sportspeople in Mexico
Chilean expatriate sportspeople in England
Expatriate footballers in Mexico
Expatriate footballers in England